Zatypota is a genus of ichneumon wasps in the family Ichneumonidae. There are at least 40 described species in Zatypota.

Species
These 49 species belong to the genus Zatypota:

 Zatypota albicoxa (Walker, 1874) c g
 Zatypota alborhombarta (Davis, 1895) c g b
 Zatypota anomala (Holmgren, 1860) c g
 Zatypota arizonica Townes, 1960 c g
 Zatypota baragi Matsumoto g
 Zatypota bayamensis Fernandez, 2007 c g
 Zatypota bingili Gauld, 1984 c g
 Zatypota bohemani (Holmgren, 1860) c g
 Zatypota brachycera Matsumoto g
 Zatypota capicola Benoit, 1959 c g
 Zatypota celer Gauld, 1984 c g
 Zatypota chryssophaga Matsumoto g
 Zatypota cingulata Townes, 1960 c g
 Zatypota crassipes Townes, 1960 c g
 Zatypota dandiensis Gauld, 1984 c g
 Zatypota dendrobia Matsumoto g
 Zatypota dichroa (Marshall, 1892) c g
 Zatypota discolor (Holmgren, 1860) c g
 Zatypota elegans Matsumoto g
 Zatypota exilis Townes, 1960 c g
 Zatypota favosa Townes, 1960 c g
 Zatypota fonsecai Gauld, 1991 c g
 Zatypota grachilipes Uchida & Momoi g
 Zatypota gracilipes Uchida & Momoi, 1958 c g
 Zatypota inexpectata (Seyrig, 1932) c g
 Zatypota kauros Gauld, 1984 c g
 Zatypota kerstinae Fritzen g
 Zatypota luteipes Townes, 1960 c g
 Zatypota maculata Matsumoto & Takasuka g
 Zatypota medranoi Gauld, 1991 c g
 Zatypota mongolica Sedivy, 1971 c g
 Zatypota morsei Gauld, 1991 c g
 Zatypota pallipes Schmiedeknecht, 1888 c g
 Zatypota patellata Townes, 1960 c g
 Zatypota percontatoria (Müller, 1776) c g
 Zatypota petronae Gauld, 1991 c g
 Zatypota phraxos Gauld, 1984 c g
 Zatypota picticollis (Thomson, 1888) c g
 Zatypota prima Benoit, 1953 c g
 Zatypota rennefer Gauld, 1984 c g
 Zatypota riverai Gauld, 1991 c g
 Zatypota solanoi Gauld, 1991 c g
 Zatypota stellata Gauld, 1984 c g
 Zatypota sulcata Matsumoto g
 Zatypota takayu Matsumoto & Takasuka g
 Zatypota talamancae Gauld, Ugalde & Hanson, 1998 c g
 Zatypota velata Gauld, 1984 c g
 Zatypota walleyi Townes, 1960 c g
 Zatypota yambar Matsumoto g

Data sources: i = ITIS, c = Catalogue of Life, g = GBIF, b = Bugguide.net

References

Further reading

External links

 

Pimplinae